Pain Shekar Kesh (also Romanized as Pā’īn Shekar Kesh; also known as Shekar Kesh) is a village in Otaqvar Rural District, Otaqvar District, Langarud County, Gilan Province, Iran. At the 2006 census, its population was 115, in 35 families.

References 

Populated places in Langarud County